Grégory Paisley (born 7 May 1977) is a French former professional footballer who played as a defender.

After his retirement in 2012, he started to work as a journalist for beIN Sport. While at Sochaux he played as they won the 2004 Coupe de la Ligue Final.

References

External links

1977 births
Living people
French footballers
Association football defenders
Ligue 1 players
Ligue 2 players
Paris Saint-Germain F.C. players
Servette FC players
Stade Rennais F.C. players
Le Havre AC players
FC Sochaux-Montbéliard players
FC Metz players
ES Troyes AC players
RC Strasbourg Alsace players
OGC Nice players
En Avant Guingamp players
French expatriate footballers
French expatriate sportspeople in Switzerland
Expatriate footballers in Switzerland